Tijde Visser is a South African rugby union player for the  in the Currie Cup. His regular position is prop.

Visser was named in the team for the fifth round of the 2020 Currie Cup Premier Division against , making his debut in the process.

References

South African rugby union players
Living people
Rugby union props
Griquas (rugby union) players
Year of birth missing (living people)